Osman Alyanak (1911 – 30 September 1991) was a Turkish footballer and actor. He appeared in more than one hundred films from 1950 to 1990.

Selected filmography

References

External links 

1911 births
1991 deaths
Turkish male film actors